Mariya Evgenyevna Vasiltsova (born 22 June 1995) is a Russian snowboarder. She competed in the 2018 Winter Olympics and in the 2022 Winter Olympics, in Women's snowboard cross.

References

External links
 
 
 
 

1995 births
Living people
Sportspeople from Novosibirsk
Snowboarders at the 2018 Winter Olympics
Snowboarders at the 2022 Winter Olympics
Russian female snowboarders
Olympic snowboarders of Russia
Competitors at the 2019 Winter Universiade